
This is a list of the 43 players who earned 1993 PGA Tour cards through the PGA Tour Qualifying Tournament in 1992.

 PGA Tour rookie in 1993

1993 Results

*PGA Tour rookie in 1993
T = Tied
 The player retained his PGA Tour card for 1994 (finished inside the top 125, excluding non-members)
 The player did not retain his PGA Tour card for 1994, but retained conditional status (finished between 126-150, excluding non-members)
 The player did not retain his PGA Tour card for 1994 (finished outside the top 150)
†Kraft won the Deposit Guaranty Golf Classic, in which money earned was official but the win was not; Rhyan finished tied for second.

Winners on the PGA Tour in 1993

Runners-up on the PGA Tour in 1993

See also
1992 Ben Hogan Tour graduates

References

PGA Tour Qualifying School
PGA Tour Qualifying School Graduates
PGA Tour Qualifying School Graduates